The 1954 Alabama gubernatorial election took place on November 2, 1954, to elect the governor of Alabama. Incumbent Democrat Gordon Persons was term-limited, and could not seek a second consecutive term.

Democratic primary
At the time this election took place, Alabama, as with most other southern states, was solidly Democratic, and the Republican Party had such diminished influence that the Democratic primary was the de facto contest for state offices; after winning the Democratic primary it was a given that the nominee would win the general election.

Candidates
 James Allen, lieutenant governor
 James H. Faulkner, state senator
 Jim Folsom, former governor
 James Gullatte
 J. Bruce Henderson, former state senator and candidate for governor in 1950
 C. C. "Jack" Owen, president of the Public Service Commission
 Henry Sweet

Results

Results

References

Alabama gubernatorial elections
1954 Alabama elections
Alabama
November 1954 events in the United States